Postplatz (Post Office Square) may refer to: 

 Postplatz (Dresden)
 Zug Postplatz railway station

See also
 Post Office Square (disambiguation)